Dutovlje is a settlement in the Municipality of Sežana in the Littoral region of Slovenia close to the border with Italy.

Name
Dutovlje was attested in written sources in 1281 as Dietemdorf (and as Dietindorf in 1284, de Dotoglan and de Dothoglan in 1300, Iuris de Dotolan in 1316–17, de Doutolan in 1317, and Dyetendorf in 1370). The Slovene name is derived from the plural demonym *Dutovľane, created from the place name Dutovo (selo) 'Duto's (village)', referring to an early inhabitant of the place. The place name thus literally means 'residents of Duto's village'.

Church
The parish church in the settlement is dedicated to Saint George and belongs to the Diocese of Koper.

Gallery

References

External links

Dutovlje on Geopedia
Pepa's Karst Garden
Stories from Karst

Populated places in the Municipality of Sežana